Bark River Township is a civil township of Delta County in the U.S. state of Michigan.  As of the 2010 census, the township population was 1,578, down from 1,650 at the 2000 census. The township takes its name from the Bark River.

Communities
It is situated on US-2 and US-41, about 11 miles west of Escanaba and just east of the Hannahville Indian Community. The ZIP code is 49807.
It is situated on M-69, about 14 miles northwest of Escanaba. The ZIP code is 49807.

Geography

Climate

Demographics
As of the census of 2000, there were 1,650 people, 612 households, and 479 families residing in the township. There were 680 housing units at an average density of 14.9 per square mile (5.8/km2). The racial makeup of the township was 95.09% White, 0.12% African American, 2.67% Native American, 0.36% Asian, 0.24% from other races, and 1.52% from two or more races. Hispanic or Latino of any race were 0.18% of the population.

There were 612 households, out of which 37.6% had children under the age of 18 living with them, 66.5% were married couples living together, 8.2% had a female householder with no husband present, and 21.7% were non-families. 19.3% of all households were made up of individuals, and 7.2% had someone living alone who was 65 years of age or older.  The average household size was 2.68 and the average family size was 3.05.

In the township the population was spread out, with 26.9% under the age of 18, 8.5% from 18 to 24, 28.8% from 25 to 44, 25.3% from 45 to 64, and 10.5% who were 65 years of age or older.  The median age was 36 years. For every 100 females, there were 106.0 males.  For every 100 females age 18 and over, there were 105.8 males.

The median income for a household in the township was $41,477, and the median income for a family was $45,221. Males had a median income of $32,083 versus $23,188 for females. The per capita income for the township was $16,649.  About 3.7% of families and 5.8% of the population were below the poverty line, including 6.3% of those under age 18 and 8.0% of those age 65 or over.

Education
It is in the Bark River-Harris School District.

Transportation
Indian Trails provides daily intercity bus service via Bark River between St. Ignace and Ironwood, Michigan.

References

Townships in Delta County, Michigan
Townships in Michigan